The Tokyo Trial is a Chinese film released in 2006.

Plot
This film was directed by Gao Qunshu and is about the International Military Tribunal for the Far East after Japan's surrender in World War II. The movie presents the trial from the point of view of the Chinese judge Mei Ju-ao.

The director and his crew spent more than a year doing research to finish the script, which is based on historical data. It cost 18 million yuan (2.25 million U.S. dollars). This film hired actors from 11 countries, including mainland China, Hong Kong, Japan and other places, including actors such as Kenneth Tsang and Damian Lau. They recreated court scenes from the trial in Chinese, English and Japanese.

It was shown in cinemas and around 100 universities across mainland China to mark the 75th anniversary of the start of Japan's invasion of China.

Cast
 Damian Lau as Mei Ju-ao, a judge
 Ken Chu as Hsiao Nan
 Kelly Lin as Yoshiko Wada
 Kenneth Tsang as Xiang Zhejun
 Eric Tsang as Masato Wada
 Tse Kwan-Ho as Yuichi Kitano
 Ying Da as Ni Zhengyu
 John Henry Cox as Joseph B. Keenan
 Daniel Albert Ziskie as William Webb
 Koike Karashiji as Ichiro Kiyose
 Akira Hoshino as Hideki Tojo
 Sakae Koike as Kenji Doihara
 Natori Tsuramasashi as Iwane Matsui
 Shingo Hiramatsu as Seishirō Itagaki
 Usaburo Oshima as Ryūkichi Tanaka
 Mo Qi as Shūmei Ōkawa
 Bai Xueyun as Wada Eiko
 Guo Tao as Y.H. Ku
 Li Yusheng as Puyi
 Zhu Hongjia as Kao Wen-pin

Release 
In 2006, the film was released in China. 
On February 1, 2007, the film. Was released in Hong Kong.

Reception
According to People's Daily, "Ten days after its debut on September 1, the film about the trial of Japanese war criminals had racked up 10 million yuan (1.25 million U.S. dollars) at the box office, despite competition from Hollywood blockbuster X-Men: The Last Stand."

See also
 Japanese war crimes
 Nanking Massacre
 Nanking (2007 film)

References

External links 
 
 Tokyo Trial at hkmdb.com
 Tokyo Trial, a movie no Chinese should miss

2006 films
Chinese war drama films
History of China on film
Films set in the 1940s
2000s Mandarin-language films
2000s Japanese-language films
Films set in Japan
World War II war crimes trials films
International Military Tribunal for the Far East
Films directed by Gao Qunshu